Keone Cole Kela (born April 16, 1993) is an American professional baseball pitcher for the Tokyo Yakult Swallows of Nippon Professional Baseball (NPB). He has played in Major League Baseball (MLB) for the Texas Rangers, Pittsburgh Pirates and San Diego Padres.

Early life
Kela attended Carson Senior High School in Carson, California, and graduated from Chief Sealth High School in Seattle, Washington. He was chosen by the Seattle Mariners in the 29th round of the 2011 MLB draft, but did not sign and enrolled at Everett Community College, where he played college baseball as a center fielder for one season.

Career

Texas Rangers
The Texas Rangers selected Kela as a pitcher in the 12th round, with the 396th overall selection, of the 2012 MLB draft. Kela signed with the Rangers following the draft.

In 2013, Kela reached the Class A South Atlantic League. He started the 2014 season in Class A-Advanced, and was promoted to the Frisco RoughRiders of the Class AA Texas League. The Rangers invited Kela to spring training in 2015. Kela made the Rangers' Opening Day roster. He collected his first career win against the Oakland Athletics on May 2, 2015. Kela finished his 2015 season with a 2.39 earned run average (ERA). He had elbow surgery and missed three months of the 2016 season. He pitched to a 5-1 record with a 6.09 ERA in 35 games in 2016.

After he showed an unprofessional lack of effort in a minor league intrasquad game, the Rangers decided to option Kela to the Round Rock Express of the Class AAA Pacific Coast League for the start of the 2017 season. He made 39 appearances for the Rangers in 2017, missing time with a stiff right shoulder. After the 2017 season, Kela underwent stem-cell therapy to treat his right shoulder. Kela became the Rangers closer in 2018.

Pittsburgh Pirates
On July 31, 2018, the Rangers traded Kela to the Pittsburgh Pirates for Taylor Hearn and Sherten Apostel.

In an April 7, 2019 game against the Cincinnati Reds, Kela was ejected after his role in a bench clearing incident involving Chris Archer, Derek Dietrich, Yasiel Puig, Amir Garrett, David Bell, and Felipe Vázquez. On July 30, 2019, Kela was involved in a second bench-clearing fracas against the Reds, and was suspended for 2 games on August 1. Kela made 32 appearances for the Pirates in 2019, pitching to a 2.12 ERA with 33 strikeouts in 29.2 innings of work. In 2020, Kela only made 3 appearances for the team, giving up 1 run in 2.0 innings with 3 strikeouts.

San Diego Padres
On February 18, 2021, Kela signed a one-year, 1.2MM contract with the San Diego Padres. On May 19, 2021, Kela underwent Tommy John surgery, ending his 2021 season. In 12 games for San Diego, Kela pitched to a 2-2 record and 5.06 ERA with 13 strikeouts. On May 23, Kela was placed on the 60-day injured list as he recovered from the surgery.

Arizona Diamondbacks
On March 16, 2022, Kela signed a minor league deal with the Arizona Diamondbacks. He was released on August 31.

Los Angeles Dodgers
On September 1, 2022, Kela signed a minor league deal with the Los Angeles Dodgers. He pitched  innings over seven games for the Triple-A Oklahoma City Dodgers, allowing six earned runs for a 6.75 ERA. He elected free agency on November 10, 2022.

Tokyo Yakult Swallows
On December 21, 2022, Kela signed with the Tokyo Yakult Swallows of Nippon Professional Baseball.

Personal
When Kela was born, his mother was only 16 years old, and his father was just 15 years old. Though Kela was born in Los Angeles, much of his father's family is from Hawaii. His grandparents are from Keaukaha on the Big Island, where Kela spent each summer, enjoying Puhi Bay and Hilo.

References

External links

Living people
1993 births
American expatriate baseball players in Venezuela
American people of Native Hawaiian descent
Arizona Complex League Diamondbacks players
Arizona League Rangers players
Baseball players from Los Angeles
Baseball players from Seattle
Everett Trojans baseball players
Frisco RoughRiders players
Hickory Crawdads players
Indianapolis Indians players
Major League Baseball pitchers
Myrtle Beach Pelicans players
Navegantes del Magallanes players
Oklahoma City Dodgers players
Pittsburgh Pirates players
Reno Aces players
Round Rock Express players
San Diego Padres players
Spokane Indians players
Surprise Saguaros players
Texas Rangers players